Yes is the third studio album by alternative rock band Morphine, released in March 1995. It was their first album to make the Billboard Top 200, but fared less well abroad than its predecessor. As of February 1997 it has sold 156,000 copies in United States according to Nielsen SoundScan.

Critical reception

In a retrospective review, AllMusic's Greg Prato felt that on Yes Morphine had moved away from the more "accessible direction" they had introduced on 1994's Cure for Pain for a more "challenging (but just as rewarding) direction." He found Yes to be "just a shade less spectacular than Cure for Pain, but certainly not by much."

Track listing

Notes
Track 8 recorded live at KCRW, Santa Monica, California, January 1994, for Morning Becomes Eclectic.
Track 10 recorded live at Bullet Sound Studios, Nederhorst den Berg, the Netherlands, May 1994, for 2 Meter Sessies, NOS/VARA TV.

2018 vinyl expanded edition 
In 2018, Yes became the first release in the Run Out Groove label's vinyl-only Cornerstones series and included a bonus record of Yes-era B-sides, unreleased outtakes from the Yes sessions and unreleased live broadcast recordings, all remastered from the original source tapes.

 side one (1-6) and two (7-12) as per original album

Notes
Track 4 recorded live at Hell West, San Francisco, California; recording and lead bass by Frank Swart.
Track 6 recorded live at Hi-N-Dry, Cambridge, Massachusetts; recording and production by Mark Sandman.
Tracks 7–10 recording date and location not listed.

Personnel
Adapted from the album liner notes.

Morphine
Mark Sandman – vocals, 2-string slide bass, piano (4), Chamberlin (7), tritar (7), guitar (12) 
Dana Colley – baritone saxophone, tenor saxophone (4, 9, 10), doublesax (3, 7)
Billy Conway – drums
Additional musicians
Frank Howard Swart – wah bass (9)
Technical
Mark Sandman – producer, engineer (12), mixing (6, 7, 9, 12), front cover photography
Paul Q. Kolderie – producer, engineer (2–4, 6, 7, 11), mixing (1–5, 11)
Mike Denneen – engineer (1, 5, 7)
Tim O'Heir – engineer (6, 7)
Scott Fritz – engineer (8)
Frank Howard Swart – engineer (9), mixing (9)
Han Nuyten – engineer (10)
Truman Stiles – mixing (6, 7) 
Phil Davidson – mixing (8, 10)
Toby Mountain – mastering
Robin Spencer – design

Charts

Weekly charts

Year-end charts

References

1995 albums
Morphine (band) albums
Albums produced by Paul Q. Kolderie
Rykodisc albums